In 2017, Nancy Abu-Bonsrah became the first black female to be accepted to train as a brain surgeon at Johns Hopkins School of Medicine, the school “where the medical discipline of neurological surgery was founded.”

Born in Ghana, Abu-Bonsrah moved to Maryland when she was 15. She studied chemistry and biochemistry at Mount Saint Mary's University in Maryland. Then she went to Johns Hopkins University to study medicine. She is the first doctor in her extended family.

Her desire to study neurosurgery was the result of shadowing a neurosurgeon when she visited Ghana when she was a junior in college.“Usually when I think about brain surgery, I think the brain is sacred and you don't touch it or do anything to it, but to see them do these remarkable surgeries, and have good outcomes was something that impressed me.” She also noticed how “overwhelmed” the surgeons appeared to be, saying: “There were countless patients that they had to see and there are so few of them.  I thought it would be nice to combine my interest in this field with an opportunity to provide service back to my country and other countries that don't have as much surgical infrastructure.”

She is married to her husband, Kwabena Yamoah, another doctor who received his M.D. from University of Maryland School of Medicine.  Abu-Bonsrah identifies as Seventh-Day Adventist.

References 

Ghanaian neurosurgeons
Living people
Mount Saint Mary College alumni
Johns Hopkins University alumni
Year of birth missing (living people)